Macha Rekai is a 1950 Indian Tamil-language film directed by P. Pullaiah and produced by T. R. Mahalingam. It is based on Thanjai N. Ramaiah Dass' play of the same name. The film stars Mahalingam, S. Varalakshmi, Santha Kumari, B. R. Panthulu, Kumari Kamala and C. T. Rajakantham. It is also the feature film debut of Vijaya Nirmala, who portrays the younger version of Mahalingam's character. The film was released on 11 August 1950 and became a moderate success.

Plot

Cast 
 T. R. Mahalingam as Macharaju
 Vijaya Nirmala as young Macharaju
 S. Varalakshmi
 Santha Kumari
 B. R. Panthulu
 Kumari Kamala
 C. T. Rajakantham

Production 
Macha Rekai was a play written by Thanjai N. Ramaiah Dass. Upon seeing the play, actor T. R. Mahalingam decided to produce and star in its film adaptation. The adaptation, also titled Macha Rekai, was directed by P. Pullaiah and produced by Mahalingam under the banner Sukumar Productions. Mahalingam portrayed the male lead Macharaju, and Nirmala (who later became known as Vijaya Nirmala) portrayed the character's younger self, thereby making her acting debut. The original lead female was Anjali Devi, who left after filming a few scenes, and was replaced by S. Varalakshmi. The film's story and dialogues were written by Ramaiah Dass. Cinematography was handled by Jithan Banerjee and G. Vittal Rao, and editing by T. M. Lal.

Soundtrack 
The soundtrack was composed by C. R. Subburaman, while Thanjai N. Ramaiah Dass was lyricist.

Release 
Macha Rekai was released on 11 August 1950. The film was distributed by Kumaravel Pictures in North Arcot, South Arcot, Chengelpet and Chittoor; and Dhanalakshmi Films in Salem. It was a moderate success.

References

External links 
 

1950s Tamil-language films
Films directed by P. Pullayya
Films scored by C. R. Subbaraman
Indian films based on plays